The Kamytzes family (plural Καμύτζαι, Kamytzai) was a Byzantine aristocratic lineage that first appeared in the late 11th century, and was prominent in the late 12th century.

The origin and etymology of the family name are unclear: the scholar Nikos A. Bees suggested an origin from the Greek kammyo, "close to the eyes", a theory which Alexander Kazhdan doesn't deny, but he also notes that the name could be of Turkish origin as well. Historian Paul Gautier specifically associated the family with the Turkish mercenary commander Kamyres, who entered Byzantine service in 1083. On the other hand, the historian Sofia Kotzabassi, presents strong arguments which conclude that the Kamytzes were of Greek origin.

The first known member of the family was Eustathios Kamytzes in 1094, who later became doux of Nicaea. Gautier considered him either to be Kamyres himself or a son or nephew. The most famous member of the family was the general Manuel Kamytzes, a son of Constantine Kamytzes and Maria Komnene. Through his mother, Manuel was connected to both the Komnenos dynasty as well as the later Angelos emperors, under whom he served. When Alexios III Angelos refused to ransom him from captivity, Manuel Kamytzes launched an unsuccessful uprising together with the Bulgarian strongman Dobromir Chrysos. The fate of the family is obscure thereafter: the Partitio Romaniae indicates that they were among the Empire's biggest land-owners, and the late 13th-century historian George Pachymeres included them among the high nobility who tried to gain influence after the death of Theodore II Laskaris in 1258, but few notable members are known, apart perhaps from a George Kammytzoboukes, who served as doux of the Thracesian Theme in 1241. 

During the Palaiologan period, the family name still occurs, but in a non-aristocratic context. A member of the family is attested as a landowner in Cephallonia in 1264, a Kamytzes who resided in Thessalonica around 1361 was involved in improper inheritance of sums from the Docheiariou monastery, while a Manuel Kamytzes was a priest who had been suspended and was restored to the priesthood in 1394.

References

Sources